Lloyd Burke may refer to:
 Lloyd L. Burke, (1924–1999), American Medal of Honor recipient
Lloyd Hudson Burke (1916–1988), American federal judge